Scoparia noacki is a moth in the family Crambidae. It was described by Nuss in 2002. It is found in the Luzon island of the Philippines.

References

Moths described in 2002
Scorparia